The National Women's Service, or SERNAM is a public service in Chile, a functionally decentralized organization, with its own funding, which is part of the cabinet-level Ministry of Planning and Cooperation under the President of Chile, created January 3, 1991 by the Law N° 19,023, with the goal of promoting the equality of men and women.

SERNAM's founding mission was to collaborate with the executive in the study and proposal of general plans and measures in order that women may enjoy equality of rights and opportunities with men, in the process of political, social, economic, and cultural development of Chile.

Organization
The upper-level direction, technical and administrative, of SERNAM is charged to the Director of Service, who has the rank of Minister of State, like an Interior Minister or Finance Minister. Its first Director was Soledad Alvear.

In each of the regions in which Chile is divided a Regional Directorship of the National Women's Service exists with its headquarters in the capital city of each respective region. There are 13 regional directorships.

Minister Directors 

 DC: Christian Democrat Party of Chile
 PPD: Party for Democracy
 PS: Socialist Party of Chile
 PC: Communist Party of Chile
 Ind: Independent

References

Further reading

External links
National Women's Service

National Women's Service
Chile, National Women's Service
Women's rights in Chile